Chief Raji Ayoola Adeleke (born 27 December 1923) was a Nigerian politician, a labour activist and a senator in the second republic who represented Osun State Senatorial District 11 which comprises six Local Governments —Ede, Osogbo, Irepodun, Ifelodun, Odo Otin, Ila Orangun.

Personal life 
Adeleke was born in his hometown of Ede on 27 December 1923. His mother, Madam Adeboyin of OniIegogoro's compound was a formal Iyalode (Head of market women) in Ede. Between 1935 and 1938 Adeleke attended St Peter's Primary School, Ede, Osun and later Ibadan Grammar School graduating in 1943. In 1947 he earned a registered nurse certificate from the medical department nursing school. He was an early member of the pioneer Union of Nigerian nurses in 1948.

In his lifetime he was the Vice-president, United Labour Congress of Nigeria, Director of Organisation Federal Labour Advisory Council, and Chairman, Nigerian Red Cross, Ede, Osun Branch.
In 1976, he was conferred with the title of Balogun of Ede. Under the Unity Party of Nigeria He was elected senator in the 1979 Nigerian parliamentary election and represented Osun State Senatorial District 11. He was married twice his second wife, Mrs Nnena Esther Adeleke was from the Old Enugu, he had five children including Senator Isiaka Adeleke, Ademola Adeleke.

References 

1923 births
Year of death missing
Members of the Senate (Nigeria) by state
People from Osun State
Unity Party of Nigeria politicians